Fraxinus greggii, the littleleaf ash or Gregg's ash, is a species of flowering plant in the family Oleaceae, native to Texas and Mexico. A xerophytic shrub or scrubby tree reaching , it is suitable for screens and containers. There is a cultivar, 'Libby Davison'.

Subtaxa
The following varieties are accepted:
Fraxinus greggii var. greggii – Texas, northeastern Mexico
Fraxinus greggii var. nummularis  – Texas, northwestern, northeastern, and southwestern Mexico, and Veracruz

References

greggii
North American desert flora
Flora of Texas
Flora of Northwestern Mexico
Flora of Northeastern Mexico
Flora of Southwestern Mexico
Flora of Veracruz
Plants described in 1877